Matrose is a German term for sailor or seaman.

Matrose may also refer to:

 Matrose, the lowest enlisted rank in the German Navy
 Matrosen, a rank in the Kriegsmarine

See also
Matros (disambiguation), a word for "sailor" in several (mostly Slavic) languages
Matross, an archaic English soldier of artillery
Matro, a Swiss mountain